The Lih-Rong An Imperial Crown Building, also known as Hua Guan Tower, is skyscraper completed in 2000 in Xinyi District, Keelung, Taiwan. As of December 2020, it is the tallest building in Keelung. The first to sixth levels house MOYA Sparkle Shopping Mall (摩亞時尚廣場) and the 7th to 10th levels house Showtime Cinemas.

See also
 List of tallest buildings in Asia
 List of tallest buildings in Taiwan

References

2000 establishments in Taiwan
Office buildings completed in 2000
Skyscraper office buildings in Taiwan
Skyscrapers in Keelung